Baheri is a city and tehsil in Bareilly district in the northern Indian state of Uttar Pradesh. It is geographically located near the lower reaches of  Gaula river.

Geography
It has an average elevation of 271 metres (889 feet).

Demographics
 India census, Baheri had a population of 68410. Males constitute 53% of the population and females 47%. Baheri has an average literacy rate of 85%, higher than the national average of 74%; with 87% of the males and 82% of females literate. 11% of the population is under six years of age.

Architecture
The type of architecture here is Anglo-Indian Style.

Economy
The major economy is based on the cultivation and agriculture. There are many food processing industries also here.

References

 

Cities and towns in Bareilly district